Brian Lacey is a former competitive rifle shooter from New Zealand.

At the 1966 British Empire and Commonwealth Games he won the silver medal in the men's 50 metre rifle prone event.

References

New Zealand male sport shooters
Commonwealth Games silver medallists for New Zealand
Shooters at the 1966 British Empire and Commonwealth Games
Shooters at the 1978 Commonwealth Games
Living people
Commonwealth Games medallists in shooting
Year of birth missing (living people)
Medallists at the 1966 British Empire and Commonwealth Games